Membrane curvature is the geometrical measure or characterization of the curvature of membranes.
The membranes can be naturally occurring or man-made (synthetic). An example of naturally occurring membrane is the lipid bilayer of cells, also known as cellular membranes. Synthetic membranes can be obtained by preparing aqueous solutions of certain lipids. The lipids will then "aggregate" and form various phases and structures. According to the conditions (concentration, temperature, ionic strength of solution, etc.) and the chemical structures of the lipid, different phases will be observed. For instance, the lipid POPC (palmitoyl oleyl phosphatidyl choline) tends to form lamellar vesicles in solution, whereas smaller lipids (lipids with shorter acyl chains, up to 8 carbons in length), such as detergents, will form micelles if the CMC (critical micelle concentration) was reached. There are five commonly proposed mechanisms by which membrane curvature is created, maintained, or controlled: lipid composition, shaped transmembrane proteins, protein motif insertion/BAR domains, protein scaffolding, and cytoskeleton scaffolding.

Geometry 
A biological membrane is commonly described as a two-dimensional surface, which spans a three-dimensional space. So, to describe membrane shape, it is not sufficient to determine the membrane curling that is seen in a single cross-section of the object, because in general there are two curvatures that characterize the shape each point in space. If you cross-section the membrane surface at a point under consideration using two planes that are perpendicular to the surface and oriented in two special directions called the principal directions, the principal curvatures are the curvatures of the two lines of intercepts between the planes and the surface which have almost circular shapes in close proximity to the point under consideration.

The principal curvatures  and  can vary arbitrarily and thereby give origin to different geometrical shapes, such as cylinder, plane, sphere and saddle. Analysis of the principal curvature is important, since a number of biological membranes possess shapes that are analogous to these common geometry staples. For instance, prokaryotic cells such as cocci, rods, and spirochette display the shape of a sphere, and the latter two the shape of a cylinder. Erythrocytes, commonly referred to as red blood cells, have the shape of a saddle, although these cells are capable of some shape deformation. The table below lists common geometric shapes and a qualitative analysis of their two principal curvatures.

Even though often membrane curvature is thought to be a completely spontaneous process, thermodynamically speaking there must be factors actuating as the driving force for curvature to exist. Currently, there are some postulated mechanisms for accepted theories on curvature; nonetheless, undoubtedly two of the major driving forces are lipid composition and proteins embedded and/or bound to membranes.

Induced by lipids

Dynamics 
Perhaps the most simple and intuitive driving force in membrane curvature is the natural spontaneous curvature exhibited by some lipids. This is because, depending on their chemical structures, lipids tend to curve with a slight spontaneously negative or positive curvature. Lipids such as DOPC (dioleoyl phosphatidyl choline), diacyl glycerol, dioleoyl phosphatidyl ethanolamine (DOPE) and cholesterol exhibit a negative spontaneous curvature. On the other hand, lipids with smaller acyl chain area to polar head group area ratio tend to curve positively, in other words they exhibit positive spontaneous curvature. The table below lists experimentally determined spontaneous curvatures for different lipids in DOPE.

The energy requirements to generate a cylinder shaped cell from an originally flat membrane can be expressed as

where L is the length of the cylinder, JB is the difference between the spontaneous curvature, Js, for the lipids in the inner and outer leaflet divided by two, and Kb is the bending modulus of the bilayer.

The radii of membrane cylinders that form in intracellular membrane-transport pathways are typically ~25–30 nm. So, the spontaneous curvature necessary to generate such cylinders equals ~(1/50) nm–1. As JB results from a difference in the spontaneous curvatures of the monolayers, an unusual membrane lipid composition would be required to produce such curvature. The lipids cholesterol, DOPE and diacylglycerol are characterized by strongly negative spontaneous curvatures (figure 1) and therefore have the potential to generate a large membrane curvature. However, even for these lipids, the required JB can be reached only if they are extensively concentrated in the internal monolayer.

Clustering 

Multiple factors influence whether a lipid will exhibit positive or negative curvature. For example, the presence of double bonds in the tail of a lipid will increase the occupied space of the tail, and thus increase the lipid's propensity to induce negative curvature. In the figure, the different shape of lipids with a double bond - also known as unsaturated - can be visualized. However, a single conically shaped lipid will not induce curvature across an entire region of the membrane. Instead, clustering of similarly shaped lipids in one leaflet compared to the other is required to induce curvature. This difference in lipid composition between leaflets is actively formed and controlled within cells by proteins such as flippases, or removed to discourage curvature by proteins such as scramblases. When asymmetric lipid compositions are present and the membrane is unable to curve due to other surrounding factors, the membrane is destabilized - further supporting the crucial role that lipid composition plays in membrane curvature. When the membrane does curve, a higher number of lipids will be required to be present on the positive curvature side of the membrane to cover the increased surface area that is present compared to the negatively curved side.

Induced by proteins 

Some biologically occurring lipids do exhibit spontaneous curvature which could explain the shapes of biological membranes. Nevertheless, calculations show that spontaneous lipid curvature alone is either insufficient or would require conditions that are unrealistic to drive the degree of curvature observed in most cells. It is now known that lipid curvature is "aided" by protein structures in order to generate complete cellular curvature.

Clustering 

Transmembrane proteins with an inherently conical shape will be more stable in, and induce curvature in membranes. Depending on the shape of the protein, this can induce either positive or negative curvature. An example is the voltage-gated potassium channel having a larger diameter on the outer leaflet than the inner leaflet of the membrane. As seen in the figure, the larger amount of space taken up in the one leaflet causes the membrane to curve away from that side.

Not only does the protein effect membrane curvature, but membrane curvature can affect membrane proteins as well. Conically shaped proteins will be less stable in membranes that are constrained to be planar, and cylindrically shaped proteins will be less stable in membranes that are constrained to have high curvature. Thus, as highly curved vesicles are formed from relatively planar membranes, proteins can be either included or excluded from the forming vesicles based on their shape.

Motif insertion 

The hydrophobic portion of protein can act as "wedge" when inserting into lipid bilayer. Epsin is one example that utilizes this mechanism to drive membrane bending. Epsin has several amphipathic alpha helices that allows it to partition between the hydrophobic core of the membrane and surrounding aqueous, hydrophilic environment. Another interesting characteristic of epsin and other proteins that bind to membranes is the fact that it shows high binding affinity for a fairly common membrane lipid, phosphatidylinositol 4,5-bisphosphate (PI-4,5-P2). Unlike other proteins that simply bend the membrane through sheer rigidity, epsin is a globular soluble protein and thus not rigid. The insertion of its helices into the membrane force the neighboring lipids of the leaflet that has been bound to expand laterally. This displacement of lipids on only one of the leaflets increases the bilayer's curvature. This figure shows membrane bending by insertion of a hydrophobic protein motif into a lipid bilayer. 
The figure illustrates a slightly different mechanism. In this case, the membrane-bending protein does not exhibit intrinsic rigidity. Instead they are often globular and soluble. The protein epsin is an example. Epsin has an ENTH (epsin N-terminal homology) domain which inserts its amphipathic alpha helix into the membrane. Epsin has high binding affinity for the membrane if PI-4,5-P2 is present.

BAR domains 

Another example of protein interactions that directly affect membrane curvature is that of the BAR (Bin, amphiphysin, Rvs’) domain. The BAR domain is present in a large family of proteins. Relative to the cellular lipid bilayer, this domain is rigid and exhibits a "banana" shape. It has been postulated that the positively charged amino acid residues in the concave region of the BAR domain would come into contact with the negatively charged polar head groups of lipids in the bilayer, thus allows the binding process. Upon binding, the membrane's curvature is increased by the rigid domain. This figure shows the bending of a membrane by a banana-shape like BAR domain.

In the figure, an illustration of a BAR domain present in a number of proteins. The membrane curvature is induced by the very shape of this proteic region. This domain attaches to the lipid bilayer through strong coulombic interactions. This idea is supported by the existence of positively charged amino acid residues in the concave region of the BAR domain. These amino acids would come into contact with the negatively charged polar head groups of lipids in the bilayer. This form phenomenon is also referred to as the "scaffold mechanism".

Scaffolding 

A classical example of membrane bending by rigid protein scaffold is clathrin. Clathrin is involved in cellular endocytosis and is sequestrated by specific signaling molecules. Clathrin can attach to adaptor protein complexes on the cellular membrane, and it polymerizes into lattices to drive greater curvature, resulting in endocytosis of a vesicular unit. Coat protein complex I (COP1) and coat protein complex II (COPII) follow similar mechanism in driving membrane curvature.  This figure shows a protein coating that induces curvature. As mentioned above, proteins such as clathrin are recruited to the membrane through signaling molecules and assemble into larger polymeric structures that form a rigid structure which serves as a frame for the membrane. Clathrin binds to its receptors that are present in the membrane.

The figure shows a protein coating that induces curvature. As mentioned above, proteins such as clathrin are recruited to the membrane through signaling molecules and assemble into larger polymeric structures that form a rigid structure which serves as a frame for the membrane. Clathrin binds to its receptors that are present in the membrane.

Cytoskeleton 

The overall shape of a cell is mostly determined by its cytoskeletal structure. This shape will vary widely depending on the location and function of the cell. The cell membrane must be able to curve around and fit the shape determined by these functions. This requires the membrane to be fluid enough to do so in a stable manner, and is often stabilized by the other mechanisms listed in this article, in particular lipid composition.

Mammalian cells will usually remain the roughly the same shape, with a common exception being locomotive cells. In order to move, these cells will often modify their structure via lamellipodia and filopodia. The membrane must be able to actively adapt to these changing curvature restraints in order for the cell to move effectively and without damaging the cell membrane.

Crowding 

The protein crowding mechanism hypothesizes that proteins can bend membrane without directly perturbing membrane structures like the above mechanisms. When a high enough local concentration of protein is present on membrane surface, repulsion between protein molecules on the membrane surface can induce membrane curvature. Although contribution of this mechanism remains unclear, multiple experimental and computation evidences have shown its potential in bending membrane. A recent study even shows that protein crowding can cause membrane bending and leads to membrane fission. These studies suggest that high local protein concentration can overcome the energy barrier to bend lipid membrane, and thus can contribute to membrane bending.

References

Membrane biology